Ryan Merkley may refer to:

Ryan Merkley (businessman), Chief of Staff to the office of the Executive Director of the Wikimedia Foundation
Ryan Merkley  (ice hockey) (born 2000), Canadian ice hockey player